The Senate Finance Subcommittee on Energy, Natural Resources, and Infrastructure is one of the six subcommittees within the Senate Committee on Finance

Members, 118th Congress

External links
Committee on Finance, Subcommittee page

Finance Energy, Natural Resources, and Infrastructure